Gene Mayer and Sandy Mayer were the defending champions and were one of sixteen teams in the second round.

There was no result for the tournament due to rain. Only the first round of matches were completed.

Seeds

Draw

Final

Top half

Bottom half

References
 1980 Congoleum Classic Draw - Men's Doubles

Congoleum Classic Doubles